The 1998–99 Eintracht Frankfurt season was the 99th season in the club's football history. In 1998–99 the club played in the Bundesliga, the top tier of German football. It was the club's 97th season in the first tier and the club's first season back in the Bundesliga, having been promoted from the 2. Bundesliga in 1997–1998 season.

The season ended in one of the most exciting final matchdays in Bundesliga history when Eintracht secured their Bundesliga spot on day 34.

Prior to the last match far behind Eintracht won three matches in a row. Eintracht hosted reigning champions Kaiserslautern, who were contending for a Champions League spot, on the last matchday. The match ended 5-1 and sent Nürnberg down to the 2. Bundesliga on goal difference. The ultimate goal was scored by Jan Åge Fjørtoft, who scored one of the most famous Bundesliga goals in the 89th minute when performing a step-over right in front of Lauterns goalkeeper Andreas Reinke before marking Eintracht's fifth goal.
Results
Friendlies

Indoor soccer tournaments

Münster

Frankfurt

Dortmund

Competitions

Bundesliga

League table

Results summary

Results by round

Matches

DFB-Pokal

Players
First-team squad
Squad at end of season

Left club during season

Eintracht Frankfurt II

Under-19s

Under-17s

Statistics
Appearances and goals

|}

Transfers

SummerIn:Out:WinterIn:Out:'

Notes

References

Sources

External links
 Official English Eintracht website 
 German archive site
 1998–99 Bundesliga season at Fussballdaten.de 

1998-99
German football clubs 1998–99 season